Francesco Valesio (1670–1742) was an Italian diarist and archeologist.

Life

Francesco Valesio was born in Rome on 14 April 1670, to Carlo Valois, medical doctor originally from Bordeaux and Giovanna Mancini of Rome. He initiated his university studies at the Roman College, where he studied philosophy and mathematics under Antonio Baldigliani and Francesco Eschinardi. He continued the course of his studies at the Sapienza University, studying Greek under Pietro Antonio Russo, and jurisprudence under Giuseppe Carpani. He was intended for further study, but then his attention was captured by antiquity and he joined the famous “academy” of Giovanni Ciampini.

He enter in the clerical state and was appointed Abbot, even if he remained always in Rome, living under somewhat reduced circumstances near San Carlo al Corso. In his home he kept a large library, which became a meeting point for small groups of scholars and antique dealers. He was a close friend of the antiquarian Philipp von Stosch. He worked as censor of hagiographies. Unlike other in his circumstance, he was not wont to flatter rich patrons.

His main interests were archeology (he published an essay with title , i.e. explanation of some statues of Campidoglio) and history (he published , i.e. historical memories of the Etruscan town of Tarquinia).

Other works of him are  about the ancient times of the town of Cortona and a new edition of the work of Fioravante Martinelli  which contains uncommon facts and places of Rome.

He died on 17 May 1742 in Rome and was buried in the church of S. Maria in Posterula. A distinct unrelated Francesco Valesio served as physician for King Phillip II of Spain.

Works
 Museo Cortonense; published by Giovanni Generosis, Rome, 1750.
 Gli Atti de gloriosi martiri Felice e Adauto, published by Giovanni Maria Salvioni, Rome, 1733.
 Roma ricercata nel suo sito, con tutta le curiosita, published by Giovanni Francesco Buagni, Rome, 1699.

References

External links 
 
 

1670 births
1742 deaths
18th-century Italian writers
18th-century Italian male writers
Writers from Rome
Italian diarists
Italian antiquarians